Cullendale is an unincorporated community in Ouachita County, Arkansas, United States. It is part of the Camden Micropolitan Statistical Area and lies at an elevation of 128 ft.

References

External links
Cullendale (Arkansas, United States - USA)
Cullendale, Arkansas (AR)
http://ouachitacountyhistoricalsociety.org/Cullendale2.pdf

Unincorporated communities in Arkansas
Unincorporated communities in Ouachita County, Arkansas
Camden, Arkansas micropolitan area